759 Naval Air Squadron (759 NAS) was a Naval Air Squadron of the Royal Navy's Fleet Air Arm. It was created on November 1st, 1939 and was disbanded on December 24, 1969. It was initially intended as a Telegraphist Air Gunner Training Squadron but became a Fighter School in 1939. It operated out of RNAS Yeovilton from 1940 to 1946, as part of the Naval Air Fighter School. It continued in this role upon reformation between 1951 and 1954, firstly at RNAS Culdrose and then from RNAS Lossiemouth. The squadron again reformed, this time at RNAS Brawdy in 1963 as the Naval Advanced Flying Training School, before finally disbanding in 1969.

History of 759 NAS

Fighter School and Pool Squadron (1939 - 1946) 

759 Naval Air Squadron formed at RNAS Eastleigh (HMS Raven), in Hampshire, on 1 May 1939, intended as a Telegraphist Air Gunner Training Squadron, but renumbered as 758 Naval Air Squadron on the 1 July 1939. 759 NAS reformed as a Fighter School and Pool Squadron on the 1 November 1939, at Eastleigh. It was initially equipped with nine Skua, five Roc and four Sea Gladiator aircraft. On the 1 December 1939 it absorbed 769 Naval Air Squadron and became the Fleet Fighter School. Ten months later, on the 16 September 1940, the squadron relocated to RNAS Yeovilton (HMS Heron) near Yeovil, Somerset, here it received Avenger, Fulmar and Master aircraft and in 1941 Sea Hurricane arrived.

The squadron was the Advanced Flying School training, as part of the No.1 Naval Air Fighter School, from April 1943. It had over sixty Sea Hurricane, over twenty Fulmar, fifteen Master and eight Spitfire aircraft at this point. From the 1 July to the 22 November 1943, a detachment from 759 NAS operated out of RNAS Angle (HMS Goldcrest), in Pembrokeshire, utilsiing its Sea Huricane and Fulmar aircraft. An instrument training flight was formed in 1944, known as 'E' Flight. Corsair aircraft were received later in 1944, and this led to the creation of a conversion flight, 'A' flight, camera air-to-air combat instruction, known as 'C' flight and 'D' flight for dummy deck landing training, however, these flights became 760 Naval Air Squadron in April 1945. 759 Naval Air Squadron disbanded at Yeovilton on the 5 February 1946.

Naval Air Fighter School (1951 - 1954) 
759 Naval Air Squadron reformed at RNAS Culdrose (HMS Seahawk), near Helston on the Lizard Peninsula of Cornwall, on the 16 August 1951, out of a part of 738 NAS. It was equipped with Firebrand and Seafire aircraft. The following year a Jet Conversion Course was added to the training courses and this pre-empted the squadron acquiring Sea Vampire and Meteor T.7 aircraft.

In November 1953, the squadron moved to RNAS Lossiemouth (HMS Fulmar), located on the western edge of the town of Lossiemouth in Moray, north-east Scotland and remained there for just under twelve months, before disbanding there on the 12 October 1954.

Naval Advanced Flying Training School (1963 - 1969) 

Here it was equipped with Hunter T.8 aircraft. The squadron provided Part 1 of the Fleet Air Arm’s Advance Flying Training course.

In 1965, 759 NAS received the annual Boyd Trophy, which is awarded annually to the naval pilot(s) or aircrew who, in the opinion of the Flag Officer, Naval Air Command, has achieved the finest feat of aviation during the previous year, for its outstanding work in converting Jet Provost-trained pilots to the Hunter aircraft.

On the 24 December 1969, 759 NAS disbanded at Brawdy.

Aircraft flown 

The squadron has flown a number of different aircraft types, including:
Blackburn Skua
Blackburn Roc
Gloster Sea Gladiator
Grumman Avenger
Fairey Fulmar
Miles Master
Hawker Sea Hurricane
Vought Corsair
Blackburn Firebrand
Supermarine Seafire
de Havilland Sea Vampire
Gloster Meteor T.7
Hawker Hunter T.8

Naval Air Stations  

759 Naval Air Squadron operated from a number of naval air stations of the Royal Navy, in Wales, Scotland and England:
Royal Naval Air Station EASTLEIGH (1 May 1939 - 1 July 1939)
Royal Naval Air Station EASTLEIGH (1 November 1939 - 16 September 1940)
Royal Naval Air Station YEOVILTON (16 September 1940 - 5 February 1946)
Royal Naval Air Station CULDROSE (16 August 1951 - November 1953)
Royal Naval Air Station LOSSIEMOUTH (November 1953 - 12 October 1954)
Royal Naval Air Station BRAWDY (1 August 1963 - 24 December 1969)

Commanding Officers 

List of commanding officers of 759 Naval Air Squadron with month and year of appointment and end:

1939 - 1946
Lt Cdr B. H. M. Kendall, RN (Nov 1939-Nov 1940)
Lt Cdr H. P. Bramwell, DSO, DSC, RN (Nov 1940-Aug 1941)
Capt F. D. G. Bird, RM (Aug 1941-Oct 1941)
Lt Cdr J. N. Garnett, RN (Oct 1941-Dec 1941)
Lt Cdr E. W. T. Taylour, DSC (Dec 1941-Apr 1942)
-unknown- (Apr 1942-Nov 1942)
Lt E. D. G. Lewin, DSO, DSC, RN (Nov 1942-Dec 1942)
Lt Cdr J. M. Bruen, DSO, DSC, RN (Dec 1942-May 1943)
Lt Cdr N. G. Hallett, DSC, RN (May 1943-Dec 1943)
Maj F. D. G. Bird, RM (Dec 1943-Jul 1944)
Lt Cdr O. N. Bailey, RN (Jul 1944-Dec 1944)
Lt Cdr J. W. Sleigh, DSO, DSC, (Dec 1944-Feb 1946)

1951 - 1954
Lt Cdr R. D. Lygo, RN (Aug 1951-May 1953)
Lt Cdr D. R. O. Price, DFC, RN (May 1953-Jul 1954)
Lt Cdr W. D. D. MacDonald, RN (Jul 1954-Oct 1954)

1963 - 1969
Lt Cdr C. D. W. Pugh, MBE, RN (Aug 1963-Jan 1964)
Lt Cdr A. H. Milnes, RN (Jan 1964-Mar 1965)
Lt Cdr C. S. Casperd, RN (Mar 1965-Oct 1966)
Lt Cdr M. I. Darlington, RN (Oct 1966-Jun 1968)
Lt Cdr C. C. N. Davis, RN (Jun 1968-Dec 1969)

Notes

References 

700 series Fleet Air Arm squadrons
Military units and formations established in 1939
Air squadrons of the Royal Navy in World War II